Johan Javier Fano Espinoza (born 9 August 1978 in Huánuco, Perú) is a Peruvian football manager and former player who played as a forward.

Career
His professional football debut was on March 5, 1995 playing for León de Huánuco. Fano has played for many Peruvian football clubs throughout his career. He has played for both Universitario and Alianza Lima, and notably scored 46 goals for Coronel Bolognesi. He has also been called to play for the Peru national football team for both friendlies and official matches (World Cup Qualifiers). He was the top-scorer for the 2007 season and signed with Once Caldas the following season and scored on his debut in the Colombian league.

In 2009, he scored 13 goals in 24 matches for Once Caldas. In December 2009 the Mexican team Atlante F.C. have signed the Peruvian forward from Colombian club Once Caldas on a one-year deal.

International career
Fano has made nine appearances for the Peru national football team. Fano scored his first international goal for Peru against Argentina in the dying seconds of stoppage time on September 10, 2008. The goal gave Peru a morale boosting tie against Argentina. This goal was an important one for his international career as well as his personal career.

International goals

References

External links

Delgol profile 

1978 births
Living people
People from Huánuco
Association football forwards
Peruvian footballers
Peru international footballers
León de Huánuco footballers
Unión Minas footballers
Club Alcides Vigo footballers
Deportivo Pesquero footballers
Sport Boys footballers
Club Alianza Lima footballers
Coronel Bolognesi footballers
Club Universitario de Deportes footballers
Once Caldas footballers
Atlante F.C. footballers
Atlético Nacional footballers
Águilas Doradas Rionegro players
Universidad Técnica de Cajamarca footballers
Peruvian Primera División players
Peruvian Segunda División players
Categoría Primera A players
Liga MX players
Peruvian expatriate footballers
Expatriate footballers in Colombia
Expatriate footballers in Mexico
Peruvian expatriate sportspeople in Mexico
Peruvian football managers
Categoría Primera A managers
Peruvian expatriate football managers
Expatriate football managers in Colombia
Águilas Doradas Rionegro managers